Glenway Wescott (April 11, 1901 – February 22, 1987) was an American poet, novelist and essayist. A figure of the American expatriate literary community in Paris during the 1920s, Wescott was openly gay. His relationship with longtime companion Monroe Wheeler lasted from 1919 until Wescott's death.

Early life

Wescott was born on a farm in Kewaskum, Wisconsin in 1901. His younger brother, Lloyd Wescott, was born in Wisconsin in 1907. He studied at the University of Chicago, where he was a member of a literary circle including Elizabeth Madox Roberts, Yvor Winters, and Janet Lewis, but left after contracting Spanish flu. 

Wescott travelled to Santa Fe to recover from Spanish flu, where he wrote his first published poetry collection, titled The Bitterns. Although, he began his writing career as a poet, he is best known for his short stories and novels, notably The Grandmothers (1927), which received the Harper Novel prize, and The Pilgrim Hawk (1940).

Career

Wescott lived in Germany (1921–22), and in France ( 1925–33), where he mixed with Gertrude Stein and other members of the American expatriate community. Wescott was the model for the character Robert Prentiss in Hemingway's The Sun Also Rises. After meeting Prentiss, Hemingway's narrator, Jake Barnes, confesses, "I just thought perhaps I was going to throw up." In the Autobiography of Alice B. Toklas (1933), Gertrude Stein wrote about him, "There was also Glenway Wescott but Glenway Wescott at no time interested Gertrude Stein. He has a certain syrup but it does not pour."

Wescott and Wheeler returned to the United States and maintained an apartment in Manhattan with photographer George Platt Lynes, whom they had met in France in 1926. When his brother Lloyd moved to a dairy farm in Union Township, near Clinton in Hunterdon County, New Jersey, in 1936, Wescott along with Wheeler and Lynes took over one of the farmhand houses and named it Stone-Blossom. Lynes ended his relationship with Wescott and Wheeler in 1943 to be with his studio assistant, George Tichenor. Nevertheless, Wescott was at Lynes' bedside when he died of lung cancer in December 1955.

His novel, The Pilgrim Hawk: A Love Story (1940), was praised by the critics. Apartment in Athens (1945), the story of a Greek couple in Nazi-occupied Athens who must share their living quarters with a German officer, was a popular success. From then on he ceased to write fiction, although he published essays and edited the works of others. In her essay on The Pilgrim Hawk, Ingrid Norton writes, "After...Apartment in Athens, Wescott lived until 1987 without writing another novel: journals (published posthumously as Continual Lessons) and the occasional article, yes, but no more fiction. The Midwest-born author seems to slide into the golden handcuffs of expatriate decadence: supported by the heiress his brother married [Barbara Harrison Wescott], surrounded by literate friends, given to social drinking and letter-writing."

Later life
In 1959, when his brother Lloyd acquired a farm near the village of Rosemont in Delaware Township, Hunterdon County, New Jersey, Wescott moved into a two-story stone house on the property, dubbed Haymeadows. In 1987, Wescott died of a stroke at his home in Rosemont and was buried in the small farmer's graveyard hidden behind a rock wall and trees at Haymeadows. Monroe Wheeler was buried alongside him following his death a year later.

Books

The Bitterns (1920) poems
The Apple of the Eye (1924) novel
Natives of Rock (1925) poems
Like a Lover (1926) stories
The Grandmothers (1927) novel [Published as A Family Portrait in England]
Goodbye, Wisconsin (1928) stories
The Babe's Bed (1930) short story [Published as a stand-alone chapbook]
Fear and Trembling (1932) essays
A Calendar of Saints for Unbelievers (1932) nonfiction
The Pilgrim Hawk (1940) novel
Apartment in Athens (1945) novel
Images of Truth (1962) essays
Continual Lessons: Journals, 1937-55 (posthumous, 1991)
A Visit to Priapus (posthumous, 2013) stories

References

Further reading
Crump, James and Anatole Pohorilenko (1998). When we were three: The travel albums of George Platt Lynes, Monroe Wheeler, and Glenway Wescott, 1925-1935. Arena Editions. .
Diamond, Daniel (2008) Delicious: A Memoir of Glenway Wescott. Toronto: Sykes Press. [See: External links]
Rosco, Jerry (2002) Glenway Wescott Personally: A Biography. Madison: University of Wisconsin Press.
Phelps, Robert, with Jerry Rosco (1990) Continual Lessons: The Journals of Glenway Wescott 1937-1955. New York: Farrar Straus Giroux.

External links
 
 
 Review of Jerry Rosco's biography and overview of Wescott's work
 A Visit to Priapus, the only explicitly gay short story by Wescott (1938), has been reprinted with permission in the gay literary journal Ganymede, #3 issue (April 2009) and in 2013 was included in A Visit to Priapus and Other Stories, the additional contents of which are described as "drawn together from midcentury literary journals and magazines of the 1920s and 1930s, as well as from Wescott's papers."
 The Loves of the Falcon Edmund White essay on Wescott and a review of books by and about him, from The New York Review of Books
  source for DELICIOUS (Diamond)
 Glenway Wescott Papers. Yale Collection of American Literature, Beinecke Rare Book and Manuscript Library
 Glenway Wescott collection, at the University of Maryland libraries

1901 births
1987 deaths
20th-century American novelists
American male novelists
People from Delaware Township, Hunterdon County, New Jersey
People from Union Township, Hunterdon County, New Jersey
People from Kewaskum, Wisconsin
American LGBT novelists
LGBT people from Wisconsin
American gay writers
Novelists from New Jersey
Novelists from Wisconsin
American male essayists
American expatriates in France
20th-century American essayists
20th-century American male writers
Presidents of the American Academy of Arts and Letters
Lost Generation writers
20th-century American LGBT people